The 1926 United States Senate special election in Ohio was held on November 2, 1926. Incumbent Republican Senator Frank B. Willis was re-elected to a second term in office, defeating former U.S. Senator Atlee Pomerene.

General election

Candidates
John D. Goerke (Socialist Labor)
Atlee Pomerene, former U.S. Senator (1911–23) (Democratic)
Frank B. Willis, incumbent Senator since 1921 (Republican)

Results

See also 
 1926 United States Senate elections

References

1926
Ohio
United States Senate